Rafael Orlando Robles Natera (October 20, 1947 – August 13, 1998) was a shortstop in Major League Baseball. He was born in San Pedro de Macorís, Dominican Republic. He was signed by the San Francisco Giants as an amateur free agent before the 1967 season, and later drafted by the San Diego Padres from the San Francisco Giants as the 51st pick in the 1968 Major League Baseball expansion draft. He played for the San Diego Padres from 1969 to 1970, and again in 1972.

Robles was the first player to come to bat in San Diego Padres history. On April 8, 1969, he led off the bottom of the 1st against right-hander Don Wilson of the Houston Astros. He reached base on an error by Hall of Fame second baseman Joe Morgan, then stole second base, but did not score.

He was at best an average fielding shortstop (.958) and a below-average hitter (.188) during his brief major league career. (47 games played)

Rafael Robles died in New York, New York at the age of 50. His son Orlando Robles is a New York-based Latin urban artist who goes by the stage name of YoungSosa. In interviews his son has been asked about his father's baseball career and has stated he is very proud of his fathers accomplishments as a professional baseball player.

External links

Retrosheet

1947 births
1998 deaths
Charleston Charlies players
Decatur Commodores players
Dominican Republic expatriate baseball players in the United States
Elmira Pioneers players
Fresno Giants players
Hawaii Islanders players

Major League Baseball players from the Dominican Republic
Major League Baseball shortstops
Salt Lake City Bees players
San Diego Padres players
Tulsa Oilers (baseball) players